Moog is a 2004 documentary film by Hans Fjellestad about electronic instrument pioneer Dr. Robert Moog. The film features scenes of Dr. Moog interacting with various musical artists who view Moog as an influential figure in the history of electronic music.

Moog is not a comprehensive history of electronic music nor does it serve as a chronological history of the development of the Moog synthesizer. There is no narration, rather the scenes feature candid conversation and interviews that serve more as a tribute to Moog than a documentary.

The film was shot on location in Hollywood, New York, Tokyo, and Asheville, North Carolina where Moog's company is based. Additional concert performances were filmed in London and San Francisco.

The film's 2004 release was designed to coincide with the fiftieth anniversary of Moog Music, Robert Moog's company that was founded as R. A. Moog Co. in 1954.

Artists who appeared in the film

 Charlie Clouser
 Herbert Deutsch
 Keith Emerson
 Edd Kalehoff
 Gershon Kingsley
 Pamelia Kurstin
 DJ Logic
 Money Mark
 The Moog Cookbook
 Mix Master Mike
 Jean-Jacques Perrey
 Walter Sear
 DJ Spooky
 Stereolab
 Luke Vibert
 Rick Wakeman
 Bernie Worrell

Soundtrack

The soundtrack features 17 original songs by different artists produced on Moog instruments:
 "Abominatron" (33)
 "Variation One" (Stereolab)
 "Bob's Funk" (The Moog Cookbook)
 "You Moog Me" (Jean-Jacques Perrey & Luke Vibert)
 "The Sentinel" (Psilonaut)
 "Unavailable Memory" (Meat Beat Manifesto)
 "When Bernie Speaks" (Bernie Worrell & Bootsy Collins)
 "Endless Horizon (I Love Bob Mix)" (Electric Skychurch)
 "Micro Melodies" (The Album Leaf)
 "I Am a Spaceman" (Charlie Clouser)
 "Sqeeble" (Plastiq Phantom)
 "Realistic Source" (Bostich)
 "You Have Been Selected" (Pete Devriese)
 "Nanobot Highway" (Money Mark)
 "Mixed Waste 4.2" (Baiyon)
 "Beautiful Love" (Tortoise)
 "Another Year Away" (Roger O'Donnell)

The double CD soundtrack album also features seven songs that prominently feature Moog instruments that were not recorded for or used in the film:
 "Lucky Man" (Emerson, Lake & Palmer)
 "Cars" (Gary Numan)
 "E.V.A." (Jean-Jacques Perrey)
 "Mongoloid" (Devo)
 "Blue Monday" (New Order)
 "Baroque Hoedown" (They Might Be Giants)
 "Close to the Edge" (Yes)

Awards
In 2004, winner of "Best Documentary" at the Barcelona Inedit Film Festival

See also
Theremin: An Electronic Odyssey

References

External links
 Official site
 

2004 films
2004 soundtrack albums
Documentary films about musical instruments
Documentary film soundtracks
2000s English-language films